Imperial Defence Services Ltd was a British based, privately owned firearms manufacturer. Born in 1947, Mick Ranger ran Imperial Defence Services, which was based in the Essex village of Takeley.  His firm had operations in Bulgaria, Cyprus, Nigeria, Australia, South Africa and Vietnam. The company website stated:

The website did not quote prices, although it is claimed that it previously stated the company sold grenade-launchers for £450, and a collection of rifles from £195 to a £20,000 General Electric Minigun.

The firm legally sold rifles to the shooter involved in the Hungerford massacre.

Mick Ranger, the owner of the company, was arrested in July 2012 to three-and-a-half years imprisonment for setting up a deal to sell missiles and handguns to Azerbaijan, a country which has had an arms export ban since 1992.

Products

 IDS MG4 - clone of M4 carbine
 IDS MG4A5 - clone of M4 carbine, with reduced barrel length
 IDS MG4A6 - clone of the CQBR

References

External links
Imperial Defence Services website, archived

Defence companies of the United Kingdom
Manufacturing companies of the United Kingdom